"Cassy O" is a song by British singer-songwriter George Ezra. It was released as the third single from his debut studio album Wanted on Voyage (2014). The song was released in the United Kingdom as a digital download on 7 March 2014 through Columbia Records.

"Cassy O'" was re-released on 23 February 2015 to co-incide with Ezra's performance at the 2015 Brit Awards and has since peaked at number 70 on the UK Singles Chart.

Music video
A music video to accompany the release of "Cassy O'" was first released onto YouTube on 24 February 2014 at a total length of three minutes and eleven seconds. In an interview with The Student Pocket Guide, when asked about the concept behind the video, Ezra said, "The whole point was to get as many Os, circle shapes, in one video."

Track listing

Charts

Certifications

Release history

References

2014 singles
2013 songs
George Ezra songs
Songs written by Joel Pott
Columbia Records singles
Songs written by George Ezra
Songs written by Cam Blackwood
Song recordings produced by Cam Blackwood